CTAB may refer to:

Cetyl trimethylammonium bromide, an antiseptic agent also used in DNA extraction
Chemical table file, a data file type used in chemoinformatics
Canadian Technology Accreditation Board, an accreditation board for post-secondary technology programs in Canada
"Lungs Clear To Auscultation Bilaterally", an abbreviation used in medical records for lung examination